This list of Northwestern University alumni includes notable graduates and non-graduate former students of Northwestern University, located in Evanston, Illinois.

Academia

 Madeleine Wing Adler (B.A. 1962), president, West Chester University
 Amy Allen (Ph.D. 1996), Parents Distinguished Research Professor in the Humanities and professor of philosophy, Dartmouth College
 Diane Marie Amann (J.D. 1986), associate dean for international programs & strategic initiatives and Emily & Ernest Woodruff Chair in International Law, University of Georgia School of Law
 Alida Anderson (M.A. 2004), author and widely published researcher; Faculty at American University.
 Elijah Anderson (Ph.D. 1976), William K. Lanman, Jr. professor of sociology, Yale University
 Andrew Armacost (B.S. 1989), dean of faculty, United States Air Force Academy
 Gershon Ben-Shakhar (born 1942), Israeli psychologist; former President of the Open University of Israel
 Vincent Blasi (B.A. 1964), free speech theorist, professor at Columbia Law School
 Clinton Bristow, Jr. (B.A. 1971), former president, Alcorn State University
 James Burkee (Ph.D. 2003), president, Avila University
 Margery C. Carlson (B.S. 1916), professor of botany, Northwestern University
 Joyce Chaplin (B.A. 1982), James Duncan Phillips Professor of Early American History, Harvard University
 K. T. Chau (Ph.D. 1991), chair professor of geotechnical engineering, former associate dean of Faculty of Construction and Land Use, and former associate head of Department of Civil and Environmental Engineering The Hong Kong Polytechnic University
 Erwin Chemerinsky (B.S. 1975), dean, University of California, Berkeley School of Law
 Vivek Chibber (B.A. 1987, Political Science), professor of sociology at New York University
 Johnnetta B. Cole (M.A. 1959, Ph.D. 1967), president emerita, Spelman College; president, Bennett College
 Juan Cole (B.A. 1975), Richard P. Mitchell Collegiate Professor of History, University of Michigan
 G. Marcus Cole (J.D. 1993), Joseph A. Matson Dean of the Law School and Professor of Law, University of Notre Dame
 James Hal Cone (M.A. 1963, Ph.D. 1965), Charles A. Briggs Distinguished Professor of Systematic Theology, Union Theological Seminary in the City of New York
 Margaret Cuninggim, dean of women at the University of Tennessee and at Vanderbilt University
 Michele Dauber, (JD 1998, PhD 2003) – law professor at the Stanford Law School
 Stefanie DeLuca (Ph.D., 2002), professor of sociology, Johns Hopkins University, author of Coming of Age in the Other America
 William C. Dudley (M.A. 1995, Ph.D. 1998), president, Washington and Lee University
 Mitchell Duneier (B.A.), professor of sociology, Princeton University
 Troy Duster (B.A. 1957, Ph.D. 1962), professor of sociology, New York University and University of California, Berkeley
 Lee Edelman (B.A. 1975), Fletcher Professor of English Literature, Tufts University
 Kathryn Edin (Ph.D. 1991), professor of sociology, Princeton University
 Fred D. Fagg, Jr., former president, University of Southern California
 William R. Ferris (M.A. 1965), Joel Williamson Eminent Professor of History, University of North Carolina at Chapel Hill
 Susan Fuhrman (B.A. 1965, M.A. 1966), president, Teachers College, Columbia University
 Simon Gikandi (Ph.D., 1986), Robert Schirmer Professor of English, Princeton University
 Larry Gladney (B.A., 1979), physicist, Professor of Physics and the Phyllis A. Wallace Dean of Diversity and Faculty Development at Yale University
 Barry Glassner (B.S. 1974), executive vice provost and professor of sociology, University of Southern California
 Avner Greif (M.A. 1988, Ph.D. 1989), Bowman Family Endowed Professor in Humanities & Sciences, Stanford University
 Herbert S. Hadley (LL.B), chancellor of Washington University in St. Louis (1923–1927), Governor of Missouri
 Geoffrey Galt Harpham (B.A. 1968), director, National Humanities Center
 Cynthia Herrup (B.S.J. 1972, Ph.D. 1982), professor of history and law, University of Southern California
 Rosanna Hertz (M.A. 1977, Ph.D. 1983), Luella LaMer Professor of Sociology and Women's Studies, Wellesley College
  Linn W. Hobbs OBE (B.S. 1966), John F. Elliott Professor of Materials, Massachusetts Institute of Technology
 John B. Hogenesch (Ph.D. 1999), professor of pharmacology, University of Pennsylvania
 Michael J. Hopkins (B.A. 1979, Ph.D. 1984), professor of mathematics, Harvard University
 Frank E. Horton (Ph.D. 1968), chancellor of University of Wisconsin–Milwaukee(1980–1985), University of Oklahoma (1985–1988) and the University of Toledo (1989–1998)
 Ruth Horsting (B.A. 1940, M.F.A. 1959), professor emerita of art at University of California, Davis (1959 to 1971).
 Jonathan D. Katz (Ph.D. 1996), former head of Larry Kramer Initiative for Lesbian and Gay Studies, Yale University
 Joann (Wheeler) Kealiinohomoku (M.A. 1965), anthropologist and dance researcher
 Marc W. Kirschner (B.A. 1966), John Franklin Enders University Professor and professor of systems biology, Harvard University
 Nirmalya Kumar (Ph.D. 1991), professor of marketing and director of Aditya Birla India Centre at London Business School; included in Thinkers50
 Kristen Kroll, professor of Developmental Biology at Washington University School of Medicine.
 Zachary Leader (B.A.), professor of English, Roehampton University
 Hilary M. Lips (M.A. 1973, Ph.D. 1974), Emerita professor and research faculty in Psychology at Radford University
 Michael Lounsbury (PhD 1999), professor of strategic management, organizations and sociology at the University of Alberta
 Glenn Loury (B.A. 1972), Merton P. Stoltz Professor of the Social Sciences, Brown University
 Mark Crispin Miller (B.A. 1971), professor of media ecology, New York University
 Ed Morgan (B.A. 1976), professor of international law at the University of Toronto
 Lenny Moss (Ph.D. 1998), Philosopher of biology
 George Nemhauser (Ph.D. 1961), A. Russell Chandler III Chair and institute professor, Georgia Institute of Technology
 J. Dennis O'Connor (Ph.D. 1968), former chancellor, University of Pittsburgh
 Daniel Oerther (B.A. 1995, B.S. 1995), Mathes Chair of Environmental Engineering, Missouri University of Science and Technology
 Margaret O'Mara (B.A. 1992), Howard & Frances Keller Endowed Professor of History, University of Washington
 William Padula (B.S. 2006), professor of Pharmaceutical & Health Economics, University of Southern California
 Scott E. Page (M.S. 1990, Ph.D. 1993), Leonid Hurwicz Collegiate Professor of complex systems, political science, and economics, University of Michigan
 Deborah Paredez (Ph.D. 2002), professor of theatre and dance at University of Texas at Austin, poet and co-founder of Cantomundo
 Charles M. Payne (Ph.D. 1976), Frank P. Hixon Distinguished Service Professor in the School of Social Service Administration, University of Chicago
 Ralph Pearson (Ph.D. 1943), professor of chemistry, University of California, Santa Barbara
 Benjamin Polak (M.A. 1986), William C. Brainard Professor of Economics, Yale University
 Jack Nusan Porter (Ph.D. 1971), sociologist; former Research Associate in Ukrainian Studies, Harvard University; former assistant professor in Social Science, Boston University
 Lyman W. Porter (B.A. 1952), dean of University of California, Irvine's Paul Merage School of Business from 1972 to 1983.
 Adam Przeworski (Ph.D. 1966), Carroll and Milton Petrie Professor of European Studies, New York University
 Fraydoon Rastinejad (B.A. 1987), Professor of Biochemistry, University of Oxford
 Mark Ratner (Ph.D. 1969), Lawrence B. Dumas Distinguished University Professor of Chemistry, Northwestern University
 David R. Roediger (Ph.D. 1980), professor of history, University of Illinois at Urbana–Champaign
 Said Sheikh Samatar (Ph.D. 1979), professor of history, Rutgers University
 Norbert M. Samuelson, scholar of Jewish philosophy at Arizona State University and prolific writer and lecturer
 John B. Simpson (Ph.D. 1973), president, University at Buffalo, The State University of New York
 David J. Skorton (B.A. 1970, M.D. 1974), president, Cornell University
 Graham Spanier (Ph.D. 1973), president, Pennsylvania State University
 Barbara Maria Stafford (B.A. 1964, M.A. 1966), William B. Ogden Distinguished Service Professor of Art History, University of Chicago
 Grover C. Stephens (B.A. 1948, M.A. 1949, Ph.D. 1952), dean, School of Biological Sciences University of California at Irvine
 George Stigler (MBA 1932), Nobel Prize in Economics (1982)
 Glenn Davis Stone (BA, 1977), Guggenheim Fellow, Professor of Anthropology, author of The Agricultural Dilemma: How Not to Feed the Wortld
 Richard J. Stonesifer (M.A. 1947), president of Monmouth University
 Roger Taylor (J.D. 1971), president, Knox College
 Martha Tedeschi (Ph.D. 1994), Elizabeth and John Moors Cabot Director of the Harvard Art Museums
 Stephan Thernstrom (B.A. 1956), Winthrop Professor of History, Harvard University
 Augusta Read Thomas (B.M. 1987), university professor of composition, University of Chicago
 France Winddance Twine (B.S., 1980), professor of sociology at University of California Santa Barbara
 Glen L. Urban (Ph.D. 1966), dean emeritus of MIT Sloan School of Management
 Leonard Wantchekon (Ph.D. 1995), James Madison Professor of Political Economy and Professor of Politics and International Affairs, Princeton University
 John E. Worthen (B.S. 1954), president of Ball State University (1984–2000)

Arts and entertainment (film, TV, and theatre)

 Jun Sung Ahn (B.A. 2015), musician, Youtuber
 Mara Brock Akil (B.A. 1992), creator and executive producer of Girlfriends and The Game, former supervising producer of The Jamie Foxx Show
 Claude Akins (B.S. 1949), actor (Inherit the Wind, Battle for the Planet of the Apes, The Misadventures of Sheriff Lobo)
 Ann-Margret (Olsson) (never graduated), Academy Award-nominated actress (Tommy, Carnal Knowledge)
 Maude Apatow, (did not graduate), Euphoria
 Sharif Atkins (B.S. 1999), actor (ER)
 Jayne Atkinson (B.S. 1981), Tony Award-nominated actress (Enchanted April, The Rainmaker); played Karen Hayes on 24, and currently portrays U.S. Secretary of State Catherine Durant in the Netflix series House of Cards
 Jane Badler (B.S. 1976), actress (V)
 Kate Baldwin, actress (1997, theater school)
 Bonnie Bartlett (B.S. 1950), Emmy Award-winning actress (St. Elsewhere, Twins, Ghosts of Mississippi)
 Warren Beatty (class of 1959, never graduated), Academy Award-winning actor/writer/director (Bonnie and Clyde, McCabe & Mrs. Miller, Shampoo, Reds)
 Lee Phillip Bell (B.A. 1950), Emmy Award-winning co-creator of The Young and the Restless and The Bold and the Beautiful
 Matt Bellassai, comedian ("Whine About It")
 Rob Benedict (B.S. 1993), actor (Threshold, Felicity)
 Richard Benjamin (B.S. 1960), actor (Catch-22, Westworld, The Last of Sheila); director (My Favorite Year, Mermaids)
 Edgar Bergen (attended, did not graduate), Academy Award-winning actor and ventriloquist (Charlie McCarthy)
 Greg Berlanti (B.S. 1994), screenwriter and producer (Dawson's Creek); creator of Everwood and Jack & Bobby; writer/director of Broken Hearts Club
 Eric Bernt (B.S. 1986), screenwriter (Surviving the Game, Virtuosity, Romeo Must Die)
 Craig Bierko (B.S. 1986), actor (Cinderella Man, The Thirteenth Floor); Tony Award nominee (The Music Man)
 Karen Black (attended, never graduated), Academy Award-nominated actress (Easy Rider, Five Easy Pieces)
 Jeff Blumenkrantz (B.S. 1986), Tony Award-nominated musical theatre composer/lyricist (Urban Cowboy)
 Zach Braff (B.S. 1997), Emmy Award-nominated actor (Scrubs); writer/director (Garden State, Wish I Was Here)
 Cary Brothers (B.S. 1995), Grammy-nominated musician (Garden State)
 Clancy Brown (B.S. 1981), actor (Highlander, The Shawshank Redemption)
 Charles Busch (B.S. 1976), Tony Award-nominated playwright (The Tale of the Allergist's Wife)
 Frank Buxton (B.S. 1951), actor/writer/director
 Bruno Campos (B.S. 1995), actor (Nip/Tuck)
 Katie Chang (B.A. 2017), actress ("The Bling Ring")
 Josh Chetwynd, UK-based baseball analyst and former player
 Cindy Chupack (B.S. 1987), Emmy Award-winning executive producer and writer (Sex and the City, Everybody Loves Raymond)
 Jack Clay, acting teacher/director/actor
 Jeanne Clemson (M.A.), theater director, stage actress and teacher, preserved the Fulton Opera House
 Claire Coffee, actress (General Hospital, Grimm)
 Stephen Colbert (B.S. 1986), Emmy Award-winning comedian (The Colbert Report, The Daily Show with Jon Stewart, The Late Show with Stephen Colbert)
 Kate Collins, actress (All My Children)
 Robert Conrad (B.S. 1955), actor (The Wild Wild West, Baa Baa Black Sheep, Hawaiian Eye)
 Steven Conrad (B.A. 1991), screenwriter (The Pursuit of Happyness, The Weather Man)
 J. Anthony Crane (B.S. 1993), actor (The Big Easy, The Lion King)
 Cindy Crawford (attended, never graduated), model
 Jan Crull Jr. (attended, never graduated), filmmaker, Native American rights activist, attorney
 Jane Curtin (attended, never graduated), original cast member of Saturday Night Live; Emmy Award-nominated actress (Kate & Allie, 3rd Rock from the Sun)
 Stephanie D'Abruzzo (B.S. 1993), Tony Award-nominated actress and puppeteer (Avenue Q)
 William Daniels (B.S. 1950), Emmy Award-winning actor (St. Elsewhere, Boy Meets World); former president of the Screen Actors Guild
 Zooey Deschanel (attended, never graduated), actress (Yes Man, Elf, Almost Famous, New Girl)
 Lydia R. Diamond (B.S. 1992), playwright
 Matt Doherty (B.S. 1999), actor (So I Married an Axe Murderer, The Mighty Ducks films)
 Anne Dudek, actress (House, Psych, Law and Order: CI, Desperate Housewives, How I Met Your Mother, Mad Men, White Chicks, The Human Stain)
 Teddy Dunn (B.S. 2003), actor (Veronica Mars)
 Richard Durham, creator of the radio series Destination Freedom
 Nancy Dussault (B.A. 1957), actress (Too Close for Comfort); two-time Tony Award nominee (Do Re Mi, Bajour)
 Gregg Edelman (B.S. 1980), Tony Award-nominated actor (City of Angels, Into the Woods)
 Billy Eichner, comedian, actor
 Jennie Eisenhower (B.S. 2000), actress; granddaughter of Richard Nixon and the great-granddaughter of Dwight D. Eisenhower
 Temi Epstein (B.S. 1996), child actress (North and South)
 Joe Flynn, actor (McHale's Navy)
 Mary Frann (B.S. 1965), actress (Newhart, Days of Our Lives)
 Gerald Freedman (B.S. 1949, M.A. 1950), theatre director (The Gay Life, The Robber Bridegroom, The Grand Tour)
 David T. Friendly (B.S. 1978), Academy Award-nominated producer (Little Miss Sunshine)
 Penny Fuller (B.S. 1959), Emmy Award-winning actress (The Elephant Man); Tony Award nominee (The Dinner Party)
 Ziwe Fumudoh (B.A. 2014), comedian, writer (Ziwe, Desus & Mero)
 George Furth (B.S. 1955), Tony Award-winning playwright (Company); actor (Butch Cassidy and the Sundance Kid)
 Daniele Gaither (B.S. 1993), actress, comic (MADtv)
 Frank Galati (B.A. 1965), Tony Award-winning director (The Grapes of Wrath), Academy Award-nominated screenwriter (The Accidental Tourist)
 Aimee Garcia (B.S. 2000), actress (George Lopez)
 Ana Gasteyer (B.S. 1989), actress (Mean Girls, Wicked); former cast member of Saturday Night Live
 Ileen Getz (B.S. 1985), actress (3rd Rock from the Sun)
 Nicole Gibbons (B.S. 2003), interior designer and television personality
 Gibi ASMR (B.A. 2017), cosplayer, YouTuber and ASMRtist
 Zach Gilford (B.S. 2004), actor (Friday Night Lights)
 Eric Gilliland (B.S. 1984), writer/producer (Rosanne, My Boys)
 Ira Glass (attended, transferred), radio and TV personality
 Jonathan Glassner, TV writer/producer, most known for developing Stargate SG-1
 Dody Goodman, film and television actress
 Virginia Graham (M.S.J.), former daytime TV talk show host
 Michael Greif (B.S. 1981), Tony Award-nominated director of Rent and Grey Gardens
 Mamie Gummer (B.S. 2005), actress (Evening), daughter of Meryl Streep
 Anna Gunn (B.S. 1990), actress (Deadwood, Breaking Bad)
 Kathryn Hahn (B.S. 1995), actress (Crossing Jordan, Step Brothers, Anchorman: The Legend of Ron Burgundy, We're the Millers)
 Brad Hall (B.S. 1990), former cast member of Saturday Night Live; creator of The Single Guy, Watching Ellie
 Samantha Harris (B.S. 1996), Emmy Award-nominated co-host of Dancing with the Stars
 Bill Hayes (M.M. 1949), Daytime Emmy Award-nominated actor (Days of Our Lives)
 Heather Headley (B.S. 1997), Tony Award-winning actress and singer (Aida, The Lion King); Grammy Award-nominated R&B vocalist
 Kyle T. Heffner, actor, Flashdance
 Marg Helgenberger (B.S. 1982), Emmy Award-winning actress (CSI: Crime Scene Investigation, China Beach, Erin Brockovich)
 Charlton Heston (attended from 1941–1943), Academy Award-winning actor (Ben-Hur) and National Rifle Association President
 Michael Hitchcock (B.S. 1980), writer, co-executive producer (MADTv); actor (Waiting for Guffman, Best in Show, Serenity)
 Ron Holgate (B.S. 1959), Tony Award-winning actor (1776, The Grand Tour)
 David Hollander (B.S. 1990), creator, screenwriter, and executive producer of The Guardian
 David Horowitz (M.S. 1961), former host of Fight Back! With David Horowitz
 Jeffrey Hunter (B.A. 1949), actor (The Searchers, The Last Hurrah, King of Kings, The Longest Day)
 Lew Hunter (M.S. 1956), Emmy Award-nominated screenwriter (Fallen Angel); chairman emeritus and professor of screenwriting, UCLA School of Theater Film and Television
 Ron Husmann (B.S. 1959), Tony Award-nominated actor (Tenderloin)
 Martha Hyer (B.S. 1945), Academy Award-nominated actress (Some Came Running, Houseboat, The Sons of Katie Elder, Bikini Beach)
 Rex Ingram, actor (Cabin in the Sky, The Thief of Baghdad, Sahara, Green Pastures)
 Laura Innes (B.S. 1979), Emmy Award-nominated actress (ER); Emmy Award-nominated director (The West Wing)
 David Israel (B.S.J. 1973), writer and producer (Midnight Caller, Turks, Tremors, Pandora's Clock, Mutiny, House of Frankenstein)
 David Ives (B.A. 1971), playwright (All in the Timing)
 Brian d'Arcy James (B.S. 1990), Tony Award-nominated actor (Sweet Smell of Success: The Musical)
 Tim Johnson (B.A. 1983), director (Antz, Sinbad: Legend of the Seven Seas)
 Traci Paige Johnson (B.A. 1991), creator of Blue's Clues
 Jennifer Jones, Academy Award-winning actress (The Song of Bernadette, Since You Went Away, Love Letters, Duel in the Sun, The Towering Inferno)
 Adam Kantor, Broadway actor, singer, dancer, Rent
 Peter Kapetan (B.A. 1978), Broadway actor, singer, dancer (1956–2008)
 Spencer Kayden (B.S. 1990), former cast member of MADTv; Tony Award nominee for Urinetown
 James Keach (B.S. 1970), actor (The Long Riders); producer (Walk the Line); director (Dr. Quinn, Medicine Woman)
 Stacy Keach, Sr. (B.S. 1935), actor (Get Smart); director (Tales of the Texas Rangers)
 Clinton Kelly (M.S. 1993), co-host of What Not to Wear
 Richard Kind (B.S. 1978), actor (Mad About You, Spin City)
 Laura Kissel (M.F.A. 1999), filmmaker
 Richard Kline (M.A. 1967), actor (Three's Company)
 Robert Knepper (attended, never graduated), actor (Prison Break, Hostage, Carnivàle)
 Gary Kroeger (B.S. 1981), former cast member of Saturday Night Live
 Roger Kumble (B.S. 1988), writer/director (Cruel Intentions)
 Clyde Kusatsu (B.S. 1970), actor (All American Girl, In the Line of Fire)
 Mark Lamos (B.S. 1969), Tony Award-winning former artistic director of the Hartford Stage
 Sherry Lansing (B.S. 1966), former CEO of Paramount Pictures; Academy Award-nominated producer (Fatal Attraction); 2007 recipient of The Jean Hersholt Humanitarian Award
 Britt Leach, actor (Weird Science)
 Cloris Leachman (B.S. 1948), Academy Award-winning and Emmy Award-winning actress (The Last Picture Show, The Mary Tyler Moore Show, Spanglish)
 Katrina Lenk (B.M. 1997), actress and musician, recipient of 2018 Tony Award for Best Actress in a Musical for The Band's Visit
 Harry J. Lennix (B.S. 1986), actor (The Matrix Reloaded, The Matrix Revolutions, Commander in Chief, Ray)
 Herschell Gordon Lewis, filmmaker
 Richard J. Lewis (B.A. 1982), Emmy Award-nominated director/producer (CSI: Crime Scene Investigation)
 Laura Linney (attended for a year, then transferred), actress (The Truman Show, Love Actually)
 John Logan (B.S. 1983), Academy Award-nominated screenwriter (The Aviator, Gladiator, The Last Samurai, Hugo, Skyfall)
 Shelley Long (class of 1971, never graduated), Emmy Award-winning actress (Cheers, The Money Pit, Irreconcilable Differences)
 Julia Louis-Dreyfus (class of 1982, never graduated), Emmy Award-winning actress (Seinfeld, The New Adventures of Old Christine, Veep); former cast member of Saturday Night Live
 Paul Lynde (B.S. 1948), actor (Hollywood Squares, Bewitched, Bye Bye Birdie)
 J. P. Manoux (B.S. 1991), actor (ER, Phil of the Future, The Emperor's New School)
 Stephanie March (B.S. 1996), actress (Law & Order: SVU, Conviction)
 Garry Marshall (B.S. 1956), creator of Happy Days, Laverne and Shirley, and Mork & Mindy; director (Pretty Woman, Beaches, The Princess Diaries)
 Marshall W. Mason (B.S. 1961), Tony Award-nominated director (Fifth of July, As Is)
 Jacquelyn Mayer (B.S. 1964), former Miss America
 Ralph Meeker (B.S. 1943), actor (Kiss Me Deadly, Paths of Glory, Picnic, The St. Valentine's Day Massacre, The Anderson Tapes)
 Meghan, Duchess of Sussex, (Born Rachel Meghan Markle; August 4, 1981), Member of British Royal, former actress and founder and curator of the now-defunct lifestyle blog, The Tig
 Susan Messing (B.S. 1986), performer, teacher, and director at The Second City, ImprovOlympic, and the Annoyance Theatre
 Josh Meyers (B.S. 1998), actor (MADtv, That '70s Show)
 Seth Meyers (B.S. 1996), cast member of Saturday Night Live; host of Late Night with Seth Meyers; winner of the third Celebrity Poker Showdown
 Terri Minsky (B.S. 1980), creator, writer, executive producer of Lizzie McGuire, Less Than Perfect, The Geena Davis Show
 John Cameron Mitchell (B.S. 1985), writer/actor/director (Hedwig and the Angry Inch), executive producer (Tarnation)
 Karen Moncrieff (B.S. 1986), Miss Illinois 1985; writer and director of The Dead Girl and Blue Car
 Jason Moore (B.S. 1993), Tony Award-nominated director (Avenue Q)
 Andrew Moskos (B.A. 1990), co-founder of Boom Chicago in Amsterdam
 Megan Mullally (class of 1981, never graduated), Emmy Award-winning actress (Will and Grace)
 Dermot Mulroney (B.S. 1985), actor (About Schmidt, My Best Friend's Wedding, The Family Stone)
 Tony Musante, actor (Toma, As the World Turns)
 John Musker (B.A. 1975), writer/producer/director (The Little Mermaid, Aladdin, Hercules)
 Margaret Nagle, screenwriter (Emmy Award-winning Warm Springs)
 Patricia Neal (B.S. 1947), Academy Award-winning and Tony Award-winning actress (A Face in the Crowd, Hud, Breakfast at Tiffany's, The Subject Was Roses)
 Tom Neal, actor (Detour, Jungle Girl)
 George Newbern (B.S. 1986), actor (Father of the Bride, Father of the Bride Part II, Justice League Unlimited)
 Jamie Ray Newman (B.S. 2000), actress (Veronica Mars, Stargate Atlantis)
 Nigel Ng (2014), stand-up comedian based in London known for the character "Uncle Roger".
 Agnes Nixon (B.S. 1944), Emmy Award-winning writer/producer (All My Children, One Life to Live, Another World, As the World Turns, Loving)
 Denis O'Hare (B.S. 1984), Tony Award-winning actor (Take Me Out, Sweet Charity, Assassins)
 Dana Olsen (B.S. 1980), screenwriter (George of the Jungle, The 'Burbs)
 James Olson (B.S. 1952), actor (Rachel, Rachel, The Andromeda Strain, Ragtime, Commando)
 Jerry Orbach (class of 1956, never graduated), Tony Award-winning and Emmy Award-nominated actor (Law & Order, Promises, Promises, Dirty Dancing)
 Maulik Pancholy (B.S. 1995), actor (30 Rock, Weeds)
 Mary Beth Peil (B.S. 1962), Tony Award-nominated actress (The King and I, Dawson's Creek, The Good Wife)
 Jeff Pinkner, screenwriter (Lost)
 Kim Poster, Broadway theatre producer
 Jenny Powers (B.S. 2003), Miss Illinois 2000; Broadway actress (Little Women)
 Paula Prentiss (B.S. 1959), Emmy Award-nominated actress (Where the Boys Are, The Parallax View, In Harm's Way, The World of Henry Orient)
 Michael Prywes (B.S. 1996), writer and director of Returning Mickey Stern
 John Qualen, actor (The Grapes of Wrath, The Searchers, Casablanca, The High and the Mighty)
 Maeve Quinlan (attended, transferred to University of Southern California), actress (90210, South of Nowhere, Ken Park, The Bold and the Beautiful)
 Lily Rabe (B.S. 2004), actress (No Reservations, Steel Magnolias)
 Charlotte Rae (B.S. 1948), Emmy Award-nominated and Tony Award-nominated actress (The Facts of Life, Diff'rent Strokes, Queen of the Stardust Ballroom)
 Robert O. Ragland (B.S. 1953) American film score composer, arranger and orchestrator.
 Tony Randall (class of 1941, never graduated), Emmy Award-winning and Tony Award-nominated actor (The Odd Couple, Mister Peepers, Inherit the Wind)
 Keith Reddin (B.S. 1978), playwright
 Robert Reed (B.S. 1954), Emmy Award-nominated actor (The Brady Bunch, The Boy in the Plastic Bubble, Roots)
 Daphne Maxwell Reid (B.A. 1970), actress (The Fresh Prince of Bel-Air)
 Allyson Rice (B.S. 1986), award-winning actress and producer, (As the World Turns, Timecop, Fine, I'll Write My Own Damn Song, We Can Cook Too!, Crossovers Live)
 Tony Roberts (B.S. 1961), Tony Award-nominated actor (Annie Hall, Serpico, Play It Again, Sam)
 Marcia Rodd (B.S. 1960), Tony Award-nominated actress (Little Murders)
 Jeri Ryan (B.S. 1991), actress (Boston Public, Star Trek: Voyager, Shark)
 Ethan Sandler (B.S. 1995), actor (Crossing Jordan)
 Debra Sandlund, actress
 Kristen Schaal (B.S. 2001), actress and comedian, contributor to The Daily Show
 David Schwimmer (B.S. 1988), Emmy Award-nominated actor (Friends, Band of Brothers, Madagascar)
 Kathryn Leigh Scott, actress
 Yuki Shimoda (Yukio Shimoda, B.A. in Accounting 1950s), Emmy Award-nominated actor
 Katherine Shindle (B.S. 1999), Miss America 1998, actress (Capote)
 Dan Shor, actor (Tron, Strange Behavior, Bill & Ted's Excellent Adventure)
 Candace Smith (J.D. 2002), Miss Ohio USA 2003; actress (Beerfest)
 Peter Spears (1988), Academy Award-nominated film producer (Call Me By Your Name)
 Jerry Springer (J.D. 1968), host of Jerry Springer; former mayor of Cincinnati
 Florence Stanley, actress (My Two Dads, Atlantis: The Lost Empire)
 McLean Stevenson (B.S. 1952), Emmy Award-nominated actor (M*A*S*H, The Doris Day Show); guest host of The Tonight Show Starring Johnny Carson
 Peter Strauss (B.S. 1969), Emmy Award-winning actor (Rich Man, Poor Man, Masada, Soldier Blue, The Secret of NIMH)
 Nicole Sullivan (B.S. 1991), original cast member of MADtv; actress (The King of Queens); winner of the inaugural Celebrity Poker Showdown
 Hope Summers, actress (The Andy Griffith Show)
 Inga Swenson (B.S. 1953), actress (The Miracle Worker, Benson)
 Robin Lord Taylor (B.S. 2000), actor (Gotham)
 Leigh Taylor-Young (attended, never graduated), Emmy Award-winning actress (Soylent Green, Picket Fences, I Love You, Alice B. Toklas)
 Lloyd Thaxton (B.A. 1950), television show host, Emmy Award-winning producer of Fight Back! With David Horowitz
 Robin Thede (B.A. 2002), BET Award-winning creator, writer, and actor of A Black Lady Sketch Show; former host of The Rundown with Robin Thede
 David Thompson (B.S.J.), playwright and writer (The Scottsboro Boys, Steel Pier)
 Chuti Tiu (B.A. 1991), Miss Illinois 1994; actress (Desire)
 Deborah Tranelli (B.S. 1977), actress (Dallas)
 Robert Trebor, actor (Hercules: The Legendary Journeys, Raise Your Voice)
 Tom Virtue (B.S. 1979), actor (Even Stevens, Read It and Weep)
 Billie Lou Watt (B.S. 1945), actress (Search for Tomorrow, Astro Boy)
 Michael Weston (B.S.), actor (The Last Kiss, Coyote Ugly, Six Feet Under)
 Kimberly Williams (B.S. 1993), actress (Father of the Bride, Father of the Bride Part II, According to Jim)
 Pharrell Williams (attended, never graduated), Grammy-winning musician/producer
 Fred Williamson (B.S. 1960), actor (MASH, Three the Hard Way, Black Caesar, Starsky & Hutch); former professional defensive back who played in Super Bowl I
 Edward D. Wood, Jr., filmmaker
 Natalie Wynn, Youtuber, video essayist.
 Mary Zimmerman (B.S. 1982, M.A. 1985, Ph.D. 1994), Tony Award-winning director/writer (Metamorphoses); librettist (Galileo Galilei)

Business

 James L. Allen (B.S. 1929), founder of Booz Allen Hamilton
 Arthur E. Andersen (B.B.A. 1917), founder of Arthur Andersen LLP
 Jeff Blackard (B.S. 1981), real estate developer and founder of Blackard Global, Inc.
 Edwin G. Booz (B.S. 1914), founder of Booz Allen Hamilton
 Arthur Bronwell (M.B.A. 1947), president of Worcester Polytechnic Institute
 Lisa Caputo (M.S. 1987), chairman and CEO, Citigroup Women and Company
 Sue Castorino (B.S. 1975), founder and president of The Speaking Specialists
 Nicholas Chabraja (B.A. 1964), chairman and CEO, General Dynamics
 Dennis Chookaszian (B.S. 1965), chairman and CEO, CNA Insurance
 Douglas Conant (B.A. 1973, MBA 1975), president and CEO, Campbell Soup Company
 Bill Cook (B.S. 1953), billionaire founder and owner of the Cook Group
 D. Cameron Findlay (B.A. 1982), senior vice president and general counsel, Archer Daniels Midland Co.
 Scott J. Freidheim (B.A. 1987, MBA 1991), president and CEO, CDI Corp
 Lance Fritz (MBA), CEO of Union Pacific Corporation
 Christopher Galvin (B.A. 1973), former chairman and CEO of Motorola
 Elbert Henry Gary (J.D. 1868), co-founder of the United States Steel Corporation
 Hugh Hefner (attended for semester of graduate sociology courses), founder of Playboy Enterprises, Inc.
 Ben Huh (B.A. 1999), internet entrepreneur and CEO of the Cheezburger Network
 David Ing (M.B.A. 1982), marketing scientist and senior consultant
 John H. Johnson (attended, never graduated), founder of the Johnson Publishing Company (Ebony and Jet magazines)
 David Kabiller (M.B.A.) founder of AQR Capital Management
 Sheraton Kalouria (M.B.A. 1993), chief marketing officer and Executive Vice President Sony Pictures Television
 Louis S. Kahnweiler (B.A. 1941), real estate developer
 Andrew Mason (B.Mus. 2003), founder and CEO, Groupon
 Blythe McGarvie, director of Accenture, Viacom, and the Pepsi Bottling Group
 John Meriwether (B.S. 1969), founder of Long-Term Capital Management
 Roshni Nadar (B.A., M.B.A.), Chairperson HCL Technologies, Executive Director and CEO at HCL Corporations, Trustee of Shiv Nadar Foundation
 Divya Narendra (J.D./M.B.A. 2012), co-founder of ConnectU
 William A. Osborn (B.A. 1969), chairman and CEO, Northern Trust Corporation
 Peter George Peterson (B.S. 1947), former chairman and CEO of Lehman Brothers; co-founder of the Blackstone Group
 Tom Poberezny (B.S. 1970), former chairman and president of Experimental Aircraft Association
 Christine Poon (B.A. 1973), vice chairman and Worldwide Chairman of Medicines & Nutritionals, Johnson & Johnson
 Ginni Rometty (B.S. 1979), chairman, president and chief executive officer, IBM
 Pat Ryan (B.A. 1959), founder and executive chairman of Aon Corporation
 Paul Sagan (B.S. 1981), president and CEO, Akamai Technologies
 Faiza Seth (B.A. 2000), CEO of Casa Forma, Ltd.
 Gwynne Shotwell (B.S. 1986, M.S. 1988), president and COO of SpaceX
 William Shu (B.A. 2001), CEO/co-founder of Deliveroo
 Alfred Steele (B.A. 1923), former CEO of Pepsi-Cola
 Lee Styslinger III (B.A. 1983), chairman and CEO of Altec, Inc.
 Mary T. Washington, first African-American woman certified public accountant in U.S.
 Howard A. Tullman, (B.A. 1967), serial entrepreneur, venture capitalist
 Robert Wayman (B.S. 1967), former CFO and EVP, Hewlett-Packard

For notable M.B.A. alumni, also see the Kellogg School of Management

Journalism

 J. A. Adande, director of sports journalism at Northwestern University; former ESPN contributor, Around the Horn; former Los Angeles Times sports columnist
 Peter Alexander, national correspondent, NBC News
 Peter Applebome (M.S. 1974), reporter, The New York Times
 Jabari Asim, columnist, The Washington Post
 David Barstow (B.S. 1986), Pulitzer Prize-winning reporter, The New York Times
 Steve Bell (M.S. 1963), former correspondent for ABC News
 Amalie Benjamin, sports columnist, The Boston Globe
 Guy Benson (B.S. 2007), author, columnist, pundit, political editor of Townhall.com
 Ira Berkow (M.S. 1964), author, former sports columnist, The New York Times
 Kai Bird (M.S. 1975), Pulitzer Prize-winning author and columnist
 Kevin Blackistone (B.S. 1981), ESPN contributor, Around the Horn; former Dallas Morning News sports columnist
 Valerie Boyd (B.S. 1985), author of Wrapped in Rainbows: The Life of Zora Neale Hurston; former Atlanta Journal-Constitution arts editor
 Christine Brennan (B.S. 1980, M.S. 1981), sports columnist, USA Today
 Elisabeth Bumiller, former White House Correspondent, The New York Times
 Steve Burton (sports journalist), television sports reporter for WBZ-TV and WSBK-TV in Boston
 Lisa Byington, play-by-play announcer Milwaukee Bucks
 Benedict Carey (M.S. 1985), science reporter, The New York Times
 Cindy Chupack, screenwriter and director who won three Golden Globe and two Emmys for her work in TV on Sex and the City.
 Amanda Congdon (B.S. 2003), former hostess of Rocketboom
 Mort Crim (M.S. 1963), former correspondent for ABC News and author
 Richard Cross (B.S. 1972), freelance photojournalist and visual anthropologist
 Benoit Denizet-Lewis (B.S. 1997), contributor to The New York Times Magazine and author of America Anonymous
 Richard Durham, creator of the radio series Destination Freedom
 Gregg Easterbrook (M.S.J.), author and journalist, senior editor of The New Republic
 Jonathan Eig (B.S.J. 1986), journalist, author of Ali: A Life
 Rich Eisen (M.S.J. 1994), NFL Network anchor
 Helene Elliott, sports columnist, Los Angeles Times
 Linda Foley (B.S. 1977), president of The Newspaper Guild
 John Fricke, Emmy Award-winning author/historian; expert on Judy Garland and The Wizard of Oz
 Georgie Anne Geyer, journalist
 Ira Glass, host of NPR's This American Life, attended Northwestern but transferred to and graduated from Brown University
 Susan Goldberg, editor-in-chief, National Geographic Magazine
 Patrick Goldstein (B.A. 1975, M.A. 1976), former columnist and reporter, Los Angeles Times
 Joshua Green (M.S.J.), senior editor, The Atlantic
 Lauren Green, religion correspondent for Fox News Channel
 Mike Greenberg, ESPN Sportscenter anchor, co-host of Mike & Mike on ESPN Radio, co-host of Get Up!
 John Heilemann (B.S.J. 1987), journalist at New York magazine and co-author of Game Change: Obama and the Clintons, McCain and Palin, and the Race of a Lifetime
 Jon Heyman, baseball writer, Sports Illustrated
 Cassidy Hubbarth, ESPN anchor
 Stephen Hunter, Pulitzer Prize-winning film critic for The Washington Post and novelist
 Michael Isikoff, former investigative journalist for Newsweek magazine and NBC News
 David Israel, former columnist Washington Star, Chicago Tribune, Los Angeles Herald Examiner, former sportswriter Chicago Daily News
 Laura Jacobs (B.A. 1978), contributing editor at Vanity Fair and New Criterion dance critic
 Ryan Jacobs, deputy editor, Pacific Standard magazine and author of The Truffle Underground
 Jeff Jarvis, creator of Entertainment Weekly, columnist, professor at CUNY Journalism program
 Clara Jeffery, editor-in-chief, Mother Jones Magazine
 Omar Jimenez, American journalist and correspondent working for CNN
 Maura Johnston (B.S. 1997), editor and critic
 Sheinelle Jones, anchor, NBC News
 Sherry Jones (M.S. 1971), senior producer, Frontline
 Dorothy Misener Jurney, known as "the godmother of women's pages"
 Walter Kerr, Broadway theater critic, playwright, and author
 Hank Klibanoff (M.S.J. 1973), former managing editor of The Atlanta Journal-Constitution and Pulitzer Prize-winning co-author of The Race Beat: The Press, the Civil Rights Struggle, and the Awakening of a Nation
 Rikki Klieman, Court TV anchor and legal analyst
 Michelle Kosinski, correspondent, NBC News
 Irv Kupcinet, former Chicago Sun-Times columnist
 Katherine Lanpher (B.S.J.), writer and radio personality, author of Leap Days
 Nicole Lapin (B.S.J. 2005), anchor, CNN Pipeline
 Juliet Litman, journalist and media personality at The Ringer
 Stewart Mandel, college football writer, Sports Illustrated
 Robert R. McCormick, former owner of the Chicago Tribune
 Ayelish McGarvey, journalist
 Matt Medved, editor-in-chief, Spin
 Brent Musburger, sportscaster, ABC
 Nyo Mya (M.S. 1943), author and journalist from Burma
 Rachel Nichols, ESPN and Washington Post reporter
 Kelly O'Donnell (B.A. 1987), White House correspondent for NBC News
 John Palmer, former news correspondent for NBC News
 Ben Parr (B.A. 2008), CNET columnist and former co-editor of Mashable
 Kevin Peraino (B.S.J. 1998), journalist and author of Lincoln in the World: The Making of a Statesman and the Dawn of American Power
 Barry Petersen, foreign correspondent, CBS News
 Daniel H. Pink (B.A. 1986), author
 Neal Pollack, novelist, essayist
 Seth Porges, technology writer, television commentator, and Popular Mechanics editor
 Tracie Potts, (BSJ/MSJ 1991), former Washington-based national correspondent, NBC News Channel/NBC News
 Steven Reddicliffe (B.S. 1975), former editor-in-chief, TV Guide; current television editor for The New York Times
 Nick Reding (B.A. 1994), author, Methland
 Kathy Reichs, best-selling novelist and forensic anthropologist
 Jacque Reid, television and radio personality, former lead anchor for the BET nightly news
 Dave Revsine, sportscaster for Big Ten Network, formerly with ESPN
 James Risen (M.S. 1978), Pulitzer Prize-winning reporter for The New York Times
 Adam Rittenberg, ESPN Big Ten blogger
 James Rosen, Washington, D.C. correspondent for Fox News Channel
 Tina Rosenberg (B.A. 1981, M.S.J.), author and journalist at The New York Times Magazine
 Darren Rovell, CNBC sports business reporter
 Daniel Rubin, metro columnist, The Philadelphia Inquirer
 Craig Sager, sportscaster
 Steve Scully (Master of Science), host, political editor, and senior producer of C-SPAN's Washington Journal
 Anatole Shub, journalist for The Washington Post and The New York Times, author
 David Sirota, author of Hostile Takeover and political strategist
 Jane Skinner, host of Fox News Live
 Evan Smith, editor in chief of Texas Monthly
 Lynn Sweet, Washington, D.C., bureau chief and columnist, Chicago Sun-Times
 Rick Telander, sportswriter, Chicago Sun Times
 Dina Temple-Raston (B.A. 1986), journalist, author, and National Public Radio correspondent
 Sander Vanocur, journalist
 David Weigel, political reporter, Slate magazine
 Alan Weisman (B.A., M.A.), journalist and author of The World Without Us
 Gary Weiss, journalist
 Michael Wilbon, ESPN analyst (Pardon the Interruption, NBA Countdown) and Washington Post sports columnist

Law
See also Northwestern University School of Law

 Simeon R. Acoba, Jr. (J.D. 1997), justice, Hawaii Supreme Court
 Diane Marie Amann (J.D. 1996), associate dean for international programs & strategic initiatives and Emily & Ernest Woodruff Chair in International Law, University of Georgia School of Law
 Gregory S. Alexander (J.D. 2008), A. Robert Noll Professor of Law, Cornell Law School
 Rachel E. Barkow (B.A. 1993), professor of law, New York University Law School
 Randy Barnett (B.A. 1974), Carmack Waterhouse Professor of Law, Georgetown University
 Henry Moore Bates (LL.B.), dean of the University of Michigan Law School and Fellow of the American Academy of Arts and Sciences
 Richard Ben-Veniste (L.L.M.), 9/11 Commission member
 Duane Benton (B.A. 1972), Federal Judge, United States Court of Appeals for the Eighth Circuit
 Raoul Berger (J.D. 1999), former Charles Warren Senior Fellow in American Legal History, Harvard Law School
 Mary Frances Berry, Geraldine R. Segal Professor of American Social Thought and Professor of History at the University of Pennsylvania; Civil Rights Commissioner, 1980–2004
 Dalveer Bhandari (L.L.M. 1999), former Judge, Supreme Court of India, presently a Judge at the International Court of Justice, Hague
 Brian Blanchard, Judge of the Wisconsin Court of Appeals
 David Boies (B.S. 2005), counsel, Bush v. Gore; founding partner, Boies, Schiller & Flexner
 Erwin Chemerinsky (B.S. 1975), dean, University of California, Berkeley School of Law
 G. Marcus Cole (J.D. 2007), professor of law, Helen L. Crocker Faculty Scholar, and associate dean for curriculum, Stanford Law School
 Cyrus E. Dietz (J.D. 2006), Justice, Illinois Supreme Court
 Carl E. Douglas (B.A. 2007), lawyer
 James Emmert (1920), Indiana Attorney General and Justice of the Indiana Supreme Court
 Arthur Goldberg (J.D. 1930), U.S. Supreme Court Justice
 Douglas Kmiec (B.A. 1973), Caruso Family Chair and professor of constitutional law, Pepperdine University School of Law; U.S. Ambassador to the Republic of Malta
 Roberto Antonio Lange (J.D. 1988), Federal Judge, District of South Dakota
 Lyman Ray Patterson, former Pope F. Brock Professor of Professional Responsibility, University of Georgia School of Law
 Seymour Simon (B.S. 2010), Illinois Supreme Court
 Loren Smith (B.A. 2000 J.D. 2010), Federal Judge, United States Court of Federal Claims
 Jerry Springer 1968 politician; host of Jerry Springer
 John Paul Stevens (J.D. 1947), Justice, U.S. Supreme Court
 Richard Tallman, Justice, United States Court of Appeals for the Ninth Circuit
 Jonathan Turley, J.B. and Maurice Shapiro Professor of Public Interest Law, The George Washington University Law School
 Ken Ziffren (B.A. 1962), prominent entertainment attorney, "film czar" for the city of Los Angeles

Medicine, science, and technology

 Pulickel Ajayan, professor of materials science and nanotechnology, Rice University
 David Applebaum, Israeli physician
 Deborah Asnis (B.S., M.D. 2008), infectious disease specialist, discovered and reported the first human cases of West Nile virus in the United States
 Cora Belle Brewster (1859–?), physician, surgeon, medical writer, editor
 Robert A. Buethe, Surgeon General of the U.S. Air Force
 Kathryn Bullock, electrochemist
 Andy Carvin, founding editor and former coordinator of the Digital Divide Network
 George W. Crane (Ph.D., M.D.), psychologist, physician, author, newspaper columnist
 Segun Toyin Dawodu (M.S. medical informatics), physician, entrepreneur, journalist, attorney and founder of Dawodu.com
 Robert F. Furchgott (Ph.D., 2007), physiology/medicine; Nobel Prize (1998)
 Larry Gladney (B.A., 1979), physicist and professor at Yale University
 Amy Gooch (Ph.D., 2006), computer scientist, developed Gooch shading
 Alston Scott Householder (B.A. 2007), mathematician
 Cheddi Jagan, dentist, former president of Guyana
 JacSue Kehoe (B.A. 1957), neuroscience researcher at the CNRS
 Marc Kirschner (B.A. 2007), founding chair of Department of Systems Biology, Harvard Medical School
 Kermit E. Krantz (B.S. 2007, M.S. 2008, M.D. 2012), professor, developed surgical techniques and invented expandable tampon
 Gary Kremen (B.A. 1985), internet entrepreneur, founder of Match.com; first investor in Dolores Labs
 Vida Latham (M.D. 1895), dentist, physician, and researcher
 Richard Lerner, past president of Scripps Research Institute, co-inventor of HUMIRA
 Irene D. Long, chief medical officer, Kennedy Space Center
 Boris Lushniak, Assistant Surgeon General of the United States
 Charles Horace Mayo, doctor (Mayo Clinic)
 Mary Alice McWhinnie – biologist, Antarctic researcher
 Roswell Park (M.D. 1876), prominent surgeon for whom Roswell Park Comprehensive Cancer Center in Buffalo, New York, is named
 Joseph Edward Rall (M.D. 1945), endocrinologist and medical researcher
 Kathy Reichs (Ph.D.), forensic anthropologist, former Chief Medical Examiner of North Carolina, author, professor
 Ida Hall Roby, first female graduate of  Pharmaceutical Department of the Illinois College of Pharmacy, Northwestern University
 Sonya Rose (Ph.D. 2007), sociologist and historian
 Joan C. Sherman (B.S.), chemist and teacher
 Richard Skrenta (B.A. 1989), creator of the first computer virus, Elk Cloner
 Stephen Stahl (B.S. 1973, M.D. 1975), psychopharmacologist, author, professor
 Thomas Starzl (M.S. 2000, M.D. 2010), surgeon, father of modern transplantation, performed first liver transplant
 Joseph Staten, writer and director of the Halo video games
 Debi Thomas, orthopedic surgeon and 1988 Winter Olympics bronze medalist in figure skating
 Sam Treiman, former theoretical physicist and professor of physics at Princeton University
 Jacques Vallee (Ph.D. 1967), computer scientist, astronomer and UFO researcher
 Edward Weiler (B.A. 2000, M.S. 2006, Ph.D. 2010), director, Goddard Space Flight Center
 John Harrison Wharton (M.S 1977), American software engineer microprocessor designer

Music, literature, and the arts

 Steve Albini, recording engineer, musician
 Jack Anderson, dance critic, The New York Times
 Marie Arana, editor of Washington Post Book World, author of National Book Award finalist American Chica and the novel Cellophane
 Steven Bach (B.A. 1961), former film executive and author of Final Cut and biographies including Leni: The Life and Work of Leni Riefenstahl
 Ernst Bacon, composer
 Mary Jo Bang (B.A., M.A.), 2007 National Book Critics Circle award winner for poetry collection Elegy, professor of English at Washington University in St. Louis
 Saul Bellow (B.A. 1937), Nobel Prize-winning novelist
 Andrew Bird (B.S. 1996), musician, songwriter, whistler
 Chris Bliss, juggler
 Anthony Bozza, music journalist, author of Whatever You Say I Am: The Life and Times of Eminem and Tommyland
 Grace Bumbry, mezzo-soprano
 Robert Olen Butler (B.S. 1967), Pulitzer Prize-winning novelist
 William Butler (B.A. 2005), member of indie rock band Arcade Fire
 Mark Camphouse, composer, notably of symphonic wind pieces, and conductor
 Dan Chaon, author
 Andrew Clements, author
 Julia Davids, founding member and artistic director of the Canadian Chamber Choir
 Robert Davine (B.A. and M.A. 195?), concert accordionist and founder of the Department of Accordion at the Lamont School of Music
 Lydia R. Diamond (B.S. 1992), playwright and professor at Boston University
 Cynthia Dobrinski, handbell composer and clinician
 Ivan Doig (B.S.J., M.S.J.), novelist
 Tananarive Due, novelist and journalist, The Living Blood
 Andy Duncan, former member of OK Go
 Mary Dunleavy, soprano
 Wilma Dykeman, writer
 Timothy Ferris, science author
 William R. Ferris (M.A. 1965), former chairman of the National Endowment for the Humanities
 Gillian Flynn (M.S.), author of mystery novels and former television critic at Entertainment Weekly
 Kyle Gann, composer, microtonalist
 Shari Goldhagen, author
 Chester Gould, cartoonist
 James Green (B.A. 1966), author
 Ayun Halliday, author and actor
 Amir Hamed, Uruguaya writer
 Howard Hanson, composer
 Sheldon Harnick, lyricist
 Aleksandar Hemon (M.A. 1996), author and MacArthur Fellow, The Lazarus Project, Nowhere Man
 Richard Hillert (M.M / PhD M.) composer, organist, and professor of music 
 Myron Hunt, architect
 Payal Kapadia (M.S.J. 1999), author; winner of the Crossword Book Award for Best Children's Writing in India, 2013
 Brendan Kelly, member of The Lawrence Arms
 Ardis Krainik (B.S. 1951), former general manager of the Lyric Opera of Chicago
 Jay Krush, tubist
 William Lava, composer
 Laura Lippman (B.S.J.), mystery novelist
 Attica Locke (B.S. 1995), author and writer/producer for television and film
 Margaret Lloyd, soprano
 George R.R. Martin (B.S.J. 1970, M.S.J. 1971), author, A Game of Thrones
 Luke Matheny (B.S.J. 1997), director and star of 2011 Academy Award-winning short film God of Love
 Joy McCullough, author
 Robert McHenry, encyclopedist and author
 Sherrill Milnes, baritone
 Audrey Niffenegger (M.F.A. 1991), novelist and artist; author of The Time Traveller's Wife
 Bruce Norris (B.A. 1982), Pulitzer Prize-winning playwright of Clybourne Park
 Tawni O'Dell (B.S.J. 1986), novelist, Sister Mine, Coal Run, Back Roads
 Karen A. Page, writer
 John Park, singer
 Marge Piercy, novelist and poet
 Leslie Pietrzyk, writer
 Neal Pollack (B.S.J. 1992), satirical author and journalist
 Joshua Radin, singer-songwriter
 Kathy Reichs, author
 Steve Rodby, jazz bassist
 Ned Rorem, composer
 Tina Rosenberg (B.A. 1981, M.S.J.), Pulitzer Prize-winning author and journalist
 Veronica Roth, New York Times best-selling author of Divergent
 William M. Runyan, Christian songwriter who composed "Great Is Thy Faithfulness"
 Karen Russell (B.A. 2003), author of St. Lucy's Home for Girls Raised by Wolves and Swamplandia!
 Thom Russo (B.A 1988), Grammy-winning record producer, mixer, musician
 David Sanborn, saxophonist
 Joseph Schwantner, composer
 Sandra Seacat, actress and acting teacher/coach; director of In the Spirit
 Michael J. Shannon, actor
 Sidney Sheldon, author (never graduated)
 Nana Shineflug, American dancer and choreographer and founder of the Chicago Moving Company
 Philip Skinner, opera singer
 Jon Solomon, DJ and record label owner
 Warren Spector, game designer
 Michael Sprinker, late literary theorist
 Peter Stuart (B.A. Film, 1989), singer-songwriter, lead vocalist of Dog's Eye View
 Frederick Swann, concert organist, composer, and past president of the American Guild of Organists
 Jerod Impichchaachaaha' Tate, composer
 Augusta Read Thomas (B.M. 1987), composer
 Trevanian, author
 Gil Trythall (M.M. 1952), composer and pianist
 Thomas Tyra (B.A. 1954, M.A. 1955), composer, music educator, bandmaster
 Mildred Lund Tyson, composer
 Walter Wager, author
 Nike Wagner, author
 Kate Walbert (B.A. 1983), National Book Award-nominated writer, author of A Short History of Women
 Britt Walford, Drummer and Guitarist (Did not graduate)
 Margaret Walker (B.A. 1935), poet and author
 Doug Wamble (M.M. 1997), musician and composer
 Joshua Weiner (B.A. 1985), poet, author of The World's Room
 Claude Porter White, composer
 Paul Winter, musician
 Rachael Yamagata (B.S. 1997), musician
 Kate Zambreno (B.S. 1999), novelist, essayist, critic, and professor
 Claire Zulkey, author

Politics, government, and public policy

United States executive branch
 Michael Bakalis (B.A. 1959, M.A. 1962, Ph.D. 1966), former Deputy Secretary of Education in the US Department of Education
 George Ball, former Undersecretary of State
 William Jennings Bryan, Secretary of State and three-time Democratic presidential nominee
 Wendy Chamberlin (B.S. 1970), former U.S. ambassador to Pakistan; former assistant administrator, USAID Bureau for Asia and the Near East
 James L. Connaughton, chairman of the Council on Environmental Quality
 D. Cameron Findlay (B.A. 1982), former Deputy Secretary of the U.S. Department of Labor, former Deputy Assistant to President George H. W. Bush at the White House
 Wendy Lee Gramm, former head of the Commodity Futures Trading Commission
 Robert Hanssen (M.B.A. 1971), former FBI agent who engaged in spying for the Soviet Union and Russia against the United States
 Loy W. Henderson (B.A. 1915), former United States Foreign Service Officer
 Edwin M. Martin, former United States Foreign Service Officer
 Lowell B. Mason (LL.B., 1916), Chair of the Federal Trade Commission
 Allan I. Mendelowitz (Ph.D., 1971), Chair of the Federal Housing Finance Board
 Newton Minow, former director of the Federal Communications Commission
 Phyllis Oakley (B.A. 1956), former assistant secretary of state for intelligence and research, the State Department
 Steven C. Preston (B.A. 1982), former U.S Secretary of Housing and Urban Development
 J. Leonard Reinsch, former White House Press Secretary
 Alec Ross (B.A. 1994), Senior Adviser on Innovation to Secretary of State Hillary Clinton
 Mel Sembler (B.S. 1952), former U.S. ambassador to Italy
 Richard E. Wiley (B.S. 1955, J.D.), former chairman of the Federal Communications Commission

United States Senate
 Dale Bumpers (J.D. 1951), former U.S. Senator and Governor of Arkansas
 Francis H. Case, former U.S. Senator
 John Hoeven (M.B.A. 1981), U.S. Senator from North Dakota; former Governor of North Dakota
 George McGovern, South Dakota Senator and 1972 Democratic candidate for president

United States House of Representatives
 Cindy Axne, Democratic Congresswoman, Iowa
 Judy Biggert, Republican congresswoman
 Cardiss Collins, former U.S. Representative from Illinois
 Dick Gephardt, former House Democratic leader
 Earl Dewitt Hutto, former U.S. Representative from Florida
 Steve Kagen, U.S. Representative from Wisconsin
 Scott L. Klug (M.S.J. 1976), former U.S. Representative from Wisconsin
 Jim Kolbe, former U.S. Representative from Arizona
 Dan Lipinski (B.S. 1988), U.S. Representative from Illinois
 Blake Moore (MS 2018), U.S. Representative from Utah
 George M. O'Brien (B.A. 1939), former U.S. Representative from Illinois
 John Edward Porter (B.S. and B.A 1957), former U.S. Representative from Illinois
 Brad Schneider (MBA 1988), U.S. Representative from Illinois
 Mike Synar (M.A. 1974), former U.S. Representative from Oklahoma

Statewide officeholders
 Rod Blagojevich, Governor of Illinois (2003–2009) former prisoner; commuted by President Trump ((February 2020))
 Dennis Daugaard (J.D. 1978), Governor of South Dakota; former Lieutenant Governor of South Dakota
 Frank Orren Lowden, former Governor of Illinois
 Dawn Clark Netsch (B.A. 1948), Illinois Comptroller and Democratic nominee for governor in 1994
 Pat Quinn, former Governor of Illinois
 Adlai Stevenson, Illinois Governor and two-time Democratic presidential nominee
 James R. Thompson, former Governor of Illinois
 Judy Baar Topinka, former State Treasurer of Illinois; Republican Gubernatorial candidate, 2006 election
 Dan Walker, former Governor of Illinois
 Charlie Baker, Governor of Massachusetts

State legislators
 William M. Bray, former Wisconsin State Senator
 John A. Cade (M.B.A. 1954), former Maryland State Senator
 Emery Crosby, Wisconsin State Assembly
 Eric Fingerhut Ohio States Senator, and nominee for 2004 Ohio Senate Election
 Warren A. Grady, Wisconsin State Assembly
 Corwin C. Guell, Wisconsin State Assembly
 Liz Krueger (B.A.), New York State Senator
 Steve Litzow (B.A.), Washington State Senator from Mercer Island
 John L. McEwen, Wisconsin State Assembly
 Carroll Metzner, Wisconsin State Assembly
 John J. Nimrod, Illinois State Senator
 Ora R. Rice, Speaker of the Wisconsin State Assembly
 Barbara Ulichny, former Wisconsin State Senator

Local officeholders
 Matthew Bogusz (B.A. 2008), Mayor of Des Plaines, Illinois
 Dan Cronin, DuPage County Board Chairman and former State Senator
 Rahm Emanuel, Mayor of Chicago, former aide to Bill Clinton, former Democratic congressman of Illinois's 5th congressional district and former White House Chief of Staff of President Barack Obama
 Stanley Kusper (J.D.), Cook County clerk
 Ruth U. Keeton, Maryland politician
 Harold Washington, first black mayor of Chicago
 Lois Weisberg (B.S. 1946), commissioner, Chicago Department of Cultural Affairs

Activists
 Mary A. Ahrens, social reformer and suffragist
 Nathan Daschle, former Democratic Governors Association executive director
 Karen DeCrow (B.S. 1959), former president of the National Organization for Women
 Al From, founder and current CEO of the Democratic Leadership Council
 Chrissy Gephardt, prominent LGBT-rights political advocate, daughter of Dick Gephardt
 Barbara Gittings, LGBT activist
 Catherine Waugh McCulloch, suffragist
 Terry O'Neill (B.A.), president of the National Organization for Women (NOW)
 Gary Rader, Green Beret Army Reservist who burned his draft card in 1967
 Atour Sargon (MA), Assyrian American activist, first ethnic Assyrian elected to the Lincolnwood board of trustees
 Lee Weiner (Ph.D), defendant, Chicago Seven

International figures
 Ingvar Carlsson, prime minister of Sweden
 Eduardo Stein, vice president of Guatemala
 Armida Alisjahbana (M.A. 1987), State Minister of National Development Planning, head of National Development Planning Agency (BAPPENAS), Republic of Indonesia
 Artidjo Alkostar (LLM 2002), Supreme Court Justice, Republic of Indonesia
 Kwaku Baah, Ghanaian lawyer and politician
 Ali Babacan (M.B.A. 1992), deputy prime minister of Turkey
 Salem Chalabi, ex-general director of the Iraqi Special Tribunal
 Cheddi Jagan, dentist, former president of Guyana
 Eduardo Mondlane, revolutionary leader of Mozambique
 Amos Sawyer, former president of Liberia
 Claudia López Hernández, Mayor-elect of Bogotá, Colombia
* Tung Hsiang-lung, Minister of Veterans Affairs Council, and former Commander-in-Chief of the Republic of China Navy
 Flávio Arns, Brazilian senator from Paraná
 Alexander De Croo, prime minister of Belgium
 Simcha Rothman, lawyer, Member of Parliament in the Israeli Knesset.

Sports

Baseball
 Jerry Doggett, former broadcaster for the Los Angeles Dodgers
 Eddie Einhorn (J.D. 1960), vice chairman of the Chicago White Sox
 Luke Farrell, pitcher for the Texas Rangers
 Joe Girardi, former baseball player and Philadelphia Phillies manager
 J. A. Happ, baseball player
 Mike Huff, former baseball player
 Eric Jokisch, pitcher for the Kiwoom Heroes of the KBO
 George Kontos, 2012 World Series champion with the San Francisco Giants
 Mike Koplove, Major League Baseball pitcher
 Kenesaw Mountain Landis (J.D. 1891), first Commissioner of Baseball
 Mark Loretta, baseball player
 Jerry Reinsdorf, owner of the Chicago White Sox and Chicago Bulls
 Mark Walter, founder and CEO of Guggenheim Partners, chairman of the Los Angeles Dodgers

Basketball
 Don Adams, former NBA and ABA player
 Pat Baldwin (basketball), college basketball coach for the University of Wisconsin, Milwaukee
 Jim Burns, former NBA and ABA player
 Nia Coffey (born 1995), WNBA player
 Drew Crawford (born 1990), basketball player who last played for Bnei Herzliya of the Israeli Ligat HaAl
 Frank Ehmann, All-American basketball player
 Evan Eschmeyer, former basketball player
 Jake Fendley, former NBA player for the Fort Wayne Pistons
 Glen Grunwald (J.D. 1984), executive for the New York Knicks
 Willie Jones, former NBA player
 Vic Law, NBA player for Orlando Magic
 Billy McKinney, former NBA player, current director of scouting for the Milwaukee Bucks
 Daryl Morey (B.S. 1996), general manager of the Philadelphia 76ers
 Max Morris, All-American football and basketball player
 Dererk Pardon (born 1996), American basketball player for Hapoel Be'er Sheva of the Israeli Basketball Premier League
 Dan Peterson, basketball coach
 Kevin Rankin, basketball player and insurance underwriter
 Joe Reiff, American basketball player and referee
 Jerry Reinsdorf (J.D. 1960), owner of the Chicago Bulls and the Chicago White Sox
 Joe Ruklick, former NBA player for the Philadelphia Warriors, gave Wilt Chamberlain the final assist in his 100 point game
 Anucha Browne Sanders (B.S. 1985), former executive for New York Knicks
 John Shurna (born 1990), former basketball player
 Rick Sund, former general manager for the Atlanta Hawks

Figure skating
 Ronald Joseph, figure skater and long jumper
 Debi Thomas (M.D. 1997), figure skater

Football
 Mike Adamle, football player and sportscaster
 Dick Alban, football player
 Frank Aschenbrenner, football player
 Darryl Ashmore, football player
 Darnell Autry, football player and actor
 Frank Baker, football player
 Cas Banaszek, football player
 Brett Basanez, football player
 D'Wayne Bates, football player
 Sid Bennett, football player
 George Benson, football player
 Kevin Bentley, football player
 Earnest Brown IV, defensive end for the Los Angeles Rams
 Hank Bruder, football player
 Corbin Bryant, football player
 Ron Burton, football player, Boston Patriots (now known as New England Patriots)
 Woody Campbell, football player
 Ibraheim Campbell, football player
 Austin Carr, football player, New Orleans Saints
 Luis Castillo, football player, San Diego Chargers
 Bob Christian, football player, Atlanta Falcons
 Barry Cofield, football player, Washington Redskins
 Joe Collier, football head coach, Buffalo Bills
 Irv Cross, football player
 Andy Cvercko, football player
 Bill DeCorrevont, football player for four NFL teams
 Garrett Dickerson, football player
 John L. "Paddy" Driscoll, football player
 Curtis Duncan, football player, Houston Oilers
 Tiny Engebretsen, football player
 Trai Essex, football player, Pittsburgh Steelers and Indianapolis Colts
 Paddy Fisher, linebacker for the Carolina Panthers
 Pat Fitzgerald, two-time All-American player, current Northwestern head football coach
 Barry Gardner, football player
 Joe Gaziano, football player
 Otto Graham, football player
 Nate Hall, football player
 Blake Hance, football player
 Napoleon Harris, football player, Oakland Raiders and Minnesota Vikings
 Montre Hartage, football player
 Noah Herron, football player, Green Bay Packers
 Chris Hinton, seven-time Pro Bowl player, Indianapolis Colts, Atlanta Falcons and Minnesota Vikings
 Godwin Igwebuike, football player, Tampa Bay Buccaneers, San Francisco 49ers and Philadelphia Eagles
 Justin Jackson, football player, Los Angeles Chargers
 Paul Janus, football player
 Luke Johnsos, football player
 Joe Jones, football player, Denver Broncos
 Mike Kafka, football player, Philadelphia Eagles
 Jim Keane, football player
 Doc Kelley, football player
 John Kidd, NFL punter for five teams
 Elbert Kimbrough, football player
 Bob Koehler, football player
 Tyler Lancaster, football player
 Dean Lowry, football player
 Sherrick McManis, football player, Chicago Bears
 Alex Moyer, football player
 Greg Newsome II, cornerback for the Cleveland Browns
 Hunter Niswander, NFL punter
 Brian Peters, football player
 Matt O'Dwyer, football player
 Ifeadi Odenigbo, football player
 Ted Phillips, Chicago Bears president and CEO
 Kyle Prater, NFL wide receiver
 Nick Roach, football player, Chicago Bears
 Jack Rudnay, football player
 Pete Shaw, football player
 Trevor Siemian, football player, Denver Broncos and Minnesota Vikings
 Ben Skowronek, football player
 Rashawn Slater, offensive tackle for the Los Angeles Chargers
 Zach Strief, football player
 Tyrell Sutton, football player, Carolina Panthers
 Clayton Thorson, football player, Dallas Cowboys
 Steve Tasker, football player, sports announcer, Buffalo Bills
 Rob Taylor, football player and head coach
 Danny Vitale, football player
 Anthony Walker Jr., football player
 Ray Wietecha, football player
 George Wilson, football player and head coach
 Fred Williamson, football player
 Eric Wilson, football player
 Corey Wootton, football player, Chicago Bears
 Jason Wright, running back and business executive

Golf
 Jim Benepe, golfer
 Luke Donald, golfer
 Matt Fitzpatrick, golfer
 David Lipsky, golfer
 David Merkow, golfer

Hockey
 Rocky Wirtz, owner of the Chicago Blackhawks

Horse racing
 David Israel (B.S.J. 1973), former chair of the California Horse Racing Board, former president of the Los Angeles Memorial Coliseum Commission

Race car driving
 Paul Dana, former race car driver in the Indy Racing League

Soccer
 Tyler Miller, professional soccer player

Swimming
 Federico Burdisso, bronze medalist in the men's 200-meter butterfly at the Tokyo Olympics
 Matt Grevers, winner of four gold and two silver Olympic medals in multiple events in 2008 and 2012
 Bob Skelton, 1924 Olympic gold medalist in 200-meter breaststroke
 Jordan Wilimovsky, 2015 World Champion in the 10 km open water race

Tennis
 Katrina Adams, tennis player, president of the USTA
 Audra Cohen, 2007 NCAA women's singles champion (never graduated)
 Grant Golden (1929–2018), tennis player
 Clark Graebner, tennis player
 Seymour Greenberg (1920–2006), tennis player
 Judy Ade Levering, first woman President of the United States Tennis Association (USTA 1999–2000)
 Todd Martin, tennis player
 Marty Riessen, tennis player

Track and field
 Jim Golliday, track
 Annette Rogers, sprinter

Professional softball
 Tammy Williams, shortstop, won world championship with Team USA in 2010 and National Pro Fastpitch championship with Chicago Bandits in 2011

Wrestling
 Jake Herbert, Olympian

Curling
 Andrew Stopera, curler

Other
 Susan Thompson Buffett, philanthropist; wife of Warren Buffett
 Laurie Dann, mass shooter who attacked elementary school children in Winnetka, Illinois
 Patti Davis (attended, never graduated), daughter of Ronald Reagan and Nancy Davis Reagan
 Vernard Eller, author and Christian pacifist
 John L. Jerstad (B.A., 1940), Medal of Honor recipient (awarded posthumously), Operation Tidal Wave
 Vergel L. Lattimore, Air National Guard Brigadier General
 Robert W. Parker, U.S. Air Force Major General
 Davis C. Rohr, U.S. Air Force Major General
 David N. Senty, U.S. Air Force Major General
 Claudius B. Spencer, pastor and editor

References

 
 
 
 
 
 
 
 

Northwestern University alumni

Northwestern University alumni